Blastus is a genus of plants in the family Melastomataceae.  Species can be found in: Japan, China, Indo-China and west Malesia.

Species 
Plants of the World Online lists:
 Blastus auriculatus Y.C.Huang
 Blastus borneensis Cogn. ex Boerl.
 Blastus brevissimus C.Chen
 Blastus cochinchinensis Lour.
 Blastus eglandulosus Stapf ex Spare
 Blastus mollissimus H.L.Li
 Blastus multiflorus Guillaumin
 Blastus pauciflorus Guillaumin
 Blastus setulosus Diels
 Blastus tenuifolius Diels
 Blastus tsaii H.L.Li

Gallery

References

External links
 

Flora of Indo-China
Melastomataceae genera